The Most Esteemed Royal Family Order of Kelantan or the Star of Yunus (Malay: Darjah Kerabat Yang Amat Di-Hormati or Bintang al-Yunusi) is an honorific order of the Sultanate of Kelantan.

History 
Instituted on 9 August 1916, this order is conferred on members of the Kelantan royal family and members of other royal families in Malaysia. It is also presented to individuals in high positions who have contributed significantly to the State.

Classes 
The order is awarded in a single class, Star of Yunus or Bintang al-Yunusi (DK). The maximum number of recipients at one time is 25 living persons, but there are no limits for honorary recipients of the order.

Notable recipients 
 Muhammad V of Kelantan
 Ismail Petra of Kelantan
 Yahya Petra of Kelantan
 Ibrahim of Kelantan
 Nazrin Shah of Perak
 Ibrahim Ismail of Johor
 Sallehuddin of Kedah (2017)
 Muhriz of Negeri Sembilan
 Sirajuddin of Perlis
 Mizan Zainal Abidin of Terengganu
 Sharafuddin of Selangor
 Tengku Anis
 Tuanku Tengku Fauziah
 Tengku Muhammad Fa-iz Petra (2003)
 Nik Ahmad Kamil Nik Mahmud
 Tunku Abdul Rahman
 Abdul Razak Hussein
 Hussein Onn
 Tengku Razaleigh Hamzah (revoked 2010, reinstalled 2018)
 Tengku Mohamad Rizam (2017)
 Mahathir Mohamad (2002, revoked 2018)
 Abdullah Ahmad Badawi (2006)
 Tengku Muhammad Fakhry Petra (2003, revoked 2010, reinstalled 2019)
 Tengku Amalin A’ishah Putri (2006)
 Sultanah Nur Diana Petra Abdullah (2022)
 Mohamed Bolkiah, Prince of Brunei (2022)

See also 
 Orders, decorations, and medals of the Malaysian states and federal territories
 Orders, decorations, and medals of Kelantan
 List of post-nominal letters (Kelantan)

References

External links 
 Colecciones Militares (Antonio Prieto Barrio), 

Orders of chivalry of Malaysia
Orders, decorations, and medals of Kelantan